John Angelo Spano Jr. (born May 31, 1964) is an American businessman and admitted fraudster. He is best known for briefly buying control of the New York Islanders franchise of the National Hockey League (NHL) in 1996, before it emerged that he did not have nearly enough assets to buy the team. He subsequently pleaded guilty to bank and wire fraud and served a federal prison sentence. Spano was convicted of 16 counts of forgery in Ohio in 2015 and is currently incarcerated in Grafton Correctional Institution with a scheduled release date of November 2024.

Early life
Spano was originally from Greenwich Village (Manhattan, in New York City), but spent most of his life in Madison, Ohio, and graduated from Ashtabula St. John High School. While at St. John he was a classmate and a high school football teammate of Urban Meyer. He graduated from Duquesne University with a degree in business administration in 1986. After working several sales jobs in Pittsburgh and Dallas, he founded the Bison Group in 1990, a Dallas-based company that primarily leased aircraft.

Interest in Dallas Stars
In September 1995, he reached a tentative agreement to buy a 50 percent interest in the Dallas Stars, but the date for the closing was pushed back several times, during which Spano began making what owner Norman Green called unreasonable demands. Green backed out of the deal in November, eventually selling the team to Tom Hicks. Years later, Jim Lites, the Stars' president at the time, recalled visiting Spano's mansion in the Dallas suburb of University Park. Despite Spano's claimed wealth, Lites said the house was unfurnished. Among the "laughable" excuses Spano offered were that he needed a copy of a written agreement with the team's top minor league affiliate, the Kalamazoo Wings and to have his South African partners meet with Stars officials. Lites also said that Spano insisted that Lites pick up the tab for their dinners—something Lites said he had never seen in all of his years as a sports executive.

Spano also made a bid for the Florida Panthers that year after his Stars bid failed, which he abandoned after then-Panthers owner Wayne Huizenga opted not to sell. Despite his failures to purchase both teams, Spano began to attract the attention of NHL commissioner Gary Bettman, who stated in an April 1997 interview that Spano was "the type of person we want as an owner." Bettman later recanted the remark after Spano's exposure.

Purchase of New York Islanders
In October 1996, Spano agreed to buy the New York Islanders from longtime owner John Pickett for $165 million: $80 million for Pickett's 90 percent stake in the team and $85 million for its lucrative cable television contract with SportsChannel New York, which at the time earned the Islanders $13 million a year. He later agreed to buy the remaining 10 percent of the team held by the management group that had been running the Islanders' day-to-day operations since 1989.

Spano billed himself as the owner of a leasing operation that he had built from one company with four employees to a group of 10 companies with 6,000 employees worldwide in a period of just six years. He claimed to be worth $230 million, most of which he attributed to have been inherited from his wealthy grandfather Angelo; he also claimed to own his $3 million University Park house free and clear.

Pickett and Bettman were initially confident about Spano, deeming him a lifesaver for the once-proud franchise. The Islanders had fallen on hard times after their four consecutive Stanley Cup championships, having missed the playoffs in five of the previous eight years; furthermore, the team was suffering at the gate, and rumors abounded that they were about to move to Atlanta, Nashville or Houston. Spano committed to keeping the team on Long Island and either renovate, rebuild or replace the aging Nassau Coliseum. He paid for the team at signing with a loan from a syndicate of banks headed by Fleet Bank. He and Pickett agreed to a five-year installment package for the cable rights, and the league's other owners approved the sale in February 1997.

The first $16.5 million payment on the cable rights was due on April 7; however, the money was not there that day. Spano promised Pickett the money would be wired out, showing him a letter from Lloyds Bank in London as proof; Pickett was satisfied and he closed the deal. Ahead of the deal's closure, Spano had already pumped $2.5 million into the team's payroll and forced head coach/general manager Mike Milbury to cede the head coaching position to Rick Bowness. He also let it be known that he intended to be a major player in the free-agent market that summer.

Revealed as a swindler
When the NHL's Board of Governors met in June 1997, Spano was not present. Instead, the Islanders were represented by two men from the Pickett regime. Upon further investigation, it emerged that Spano had only paid a total of $26,200 to Pickett for the cable rights after five attempts. On one attempt, he'd wired Pickett only $5,000 instead of the $5 million originally agreed upon. On another, a $17 million check had bounced. On another, he sent $1,700 when he was supposed to send $17 million. At the request of Pickett, Bettman ordered Spano to remove himself from day-to-day control of the Islanders and not use any team assets until the dispute could be settled.

In early July, Newsday, acting on tips from anonymous Islanders executives that their new boss was worth significantly less than advertised, began investigating Spano's background. On July 9, Newsday published a story that exposed Spano as a fraud who was not worth even a fraction of the money required to complete the Islanders deal. Among other things, the Newsday investigation revealed:

 He had grossly misrepresented his net worth; he was worth only $5 million.
 His Bison Group had 22 employees and assets of $3 million.
 He had lied about numerous items on his résumé. For instance, he had claimed to have graduated from an exclusive prep school in Ohio, but had actually graduated from a small Catholic school in Ashtabula.
 His "inherited wealth" did not exist; neither of his grandfathers had an estate valued at more than $246,000.

Under the terms of a mediation brokered by Bettman, Spano relinquished control of the Islanders back to Pickett on July 11. In return, Pickett agreed not to sue Spano for breach of contract. Spano later told Sports Illustrated that a "significant" capital call and a payment on a note blew apart his plans to pay Pickett. However, he claimed that once Pickett asked Bettman to intervene and the story broke in the press, it was impossible for him to resolve the dispute. It also emerged that Spano owed $85,000 in back property taxes on his home.

There had been some questions about Spano even before the Islanders deal came unraveled; the other NHL owners were reportedly wary of Spano well before his purchase of the team was approved. Then-New Jersey Devils owner John McMullen, for instance, told Stan Fischler (a longtime television analyst for SportsChannel New York, which owned and still owns the Islanders' TV rights under the name MSG Plus) that he was unsure if Spano was even using his own money to buy the team. Fischler also learned that Spano had promised the leader of an Islanders fan club a post as his "special advisor," but had not informed anyone within the Islanders organization about it. Spano had also offered the team presidency to former Islanders great Denis Potvin (who had reportedly planned to fire Milbury altogether), but negotiations collapsed after Spano apparently told Potvin that he was running out of money. Potvin later said that Spano had almost no staff, which was unusual for a multimillionaire.

Not long after Spano's cover was blown, it emerged that Spano was also being sued by South African cookware maker Lenco Holdings. Spano had reached a deal with Lenco to sell its pots and pans to American buyers at Nordstrom; however, Nordstrom had never sold cookware, and the department code on the purported Nordstrom purchase order was for women's coats. Spano borrowed against the venture to secure a $1 million loan from Comerica. He was also being sued by a Dallas law firm after it was revealed that he had not paid them for legal work during his abortive run at the Stars. Had either of these suits come to light sooner, it is likely that Spano's pursuit of the Islanders would have been over before it started.

Arrest and incarceration
The Newsday report revealed that a federal investigation into Spano's affairs was well underway. On July 23, federal prosecutors on Long Island charged Spano with multiple counts of bank fraud, wire fraud and forgery. On August 14, federal prosecutors in Fort Worth indicted Spano with additional unrelated charges of bank fraud and wire fraud for bilking two lenders out of $5.1 million. Soon afterward, federal prosecutors in Boston (home to Fleet) began investigating Spano regarding the $80 million loan.

Prosecutors obtained evidence that Spano had forged numerous letters from bank officials in his business dealings from 1995 onward. After Spano bounced the $17 million check, Comerica reportedly sent a letter to Pickett's attorneys saying he had funds to cover the overdraft. However, the executive who purportedly signed it denied ever writing it. Moreover, the letter was written in two different fonts, one on the body and another on the signature block. A postal inspector found that the fax machine mark at the top of the page was an exact match to the one used by Spano's Bison Group. The fax machine mark on a letter purportedly from Donaldson, Lufkin & Jenrette that claimed Spano owned Treasury bills worth $27 million was also an exact match to the one used by Bison Group.

It also emerged that many of the banks who gave money to Spano had abandoned their traditional safeguards. Fleet had relied on a letter from a Comerica senior vice president saying that Spano was worth over $100 million. This figure was based on what were later described as "unverified documents" provided by Spano. Additionally, a Dallas attorney claimed as trustee of a $107 million trust later told prosecutors he was unable to verify the trust's existence because of Spano's reluctance to document the funds. The Fleet loan officer who approved the $80 million deal was forced to resign.

Spano initially fled to the Cayman Islands, but eventually agreed to return to the United States. On October 8, he pleaded guilty to the charges lodged by prosecutors on Long Island and Texas, admitting to forging documents and that he had planned to defraud the Islanders and Pickett.

The plea deal called for him to plead guilty to bank fraud charges in Boston a week later, but several deadlines came and went, and Spano began making noises in late November about withdrawing his plea. As a result, a Boston grand jury indicted him for bank fraud, and federal prosecutors there made plans to file a superseding indictment that could have sent him to prison for 60 years. However, Spano's new attorneys resigned due to concerns that they would not be paid, and Spano had no choice but to accept the original offer. He pleaded guilty to bank fraud on January 13, 1998.

In 1999, his wife divorced him and sold their house, and he moved to a Philadelphia condo where he had tried to pay the rent with an expired credit card, $10,000 in bad checks and wire transfers. This led to his arrest in February, and he lost his bail.

On January 28, 2000, he was sentenced to 71 months in federal prison and ordered to pay restitution of $11.9 million to his victims, including the Islanders ($3.4 million), two Dallas businesses ($4.4 million), and Mario Lemieux ($1.25 million).

Aftermath
Spano was released in June 2004 on five years' supervised release and moved to a Cleveland suburb. However, he was arrested again in February 2005 for defrauding numerous companies by promising to obtain loans for them and pocketing the fees without getting the loans. He was jailed for 51 months and released from prison on April 3, 2009.

On August 20, 2014, Spano was indicted by a grand jury in Ohio on one count of theft and 44 counts of forgery. In a scheme that took place from June 2011 until July 2013, Spano stole from his employers Image First, which rents linens to outpatient facilities in Ohio, and its sister company London Cleaners. He pleaded guilty to charges of collecting almost $70,000 in commissions on fraudulent accounts in May 2015 and was sentenced to 10 years prison on June 17, 2015. He was also ordered to pay more than $75,000 in restitution to Image First.

Legacy
The Spano fiasco was highly embarrassing to the NHL, which was still reeling from revelations that former NHLPA head Alan Eagleson had lied to his clients and enriched himself by skimming off the union's pension fund. The NHL was particularly shaken after it was revealed that it spent well under $1,000 evaluating Spano's credentials (estimates range from $525 to $750); most leagues spend well over $30,000 to evaluate prospective team owners. When Spano bid for the Stars, the team was satisfied by a letter supposedly from Comerica attesting to his net worth. Prospective NHL owners are now vetted by Ernst and Young and a New York City accounting firm.

Despite these safeguards, the NHL had two additional fraudsters take advantage of the league in the following years: first, John Rigas purchased the Buffalo Sabres in 1997, only to have the league take over the franchise after his 2002 arrest for fraud. Second, in 2007, the Nashville Predators were sold to a group that included a nearly 30% share to William "Boots" Del Biaggio III, who was later revealed to have fraudulently obtained $110 million in loans from two NHL owners and eight banks in order to purchase a stake in the Predators, a crime for which he was sentenced to eight years in prison on September 8, 2009 and ordered to sell his share of the team.

After several attempts at interviews and possible documentaries, an ESPN 30 for 30 film, Big Shot, directed by actor Kevin Connolly, related John Spano's time as prospective owner of the New York Islanders and Spano himself appeared in the film to explain his actions. The film was screened as part of the Sports portion of the 2013 TriBeCa Film Festival. The film subsequently premiered on television in October 2013.

References

External links 
New York Times archive of stories on Spano case
Lease broker arrested again (2005 arrest)

1964 births
Living people
American businesspeople convicted of crimes
American people convicted of theft
American people convicted of fraud
Businesspeople from New York City
Impostors
New York Islanders executives
People from Madison, Ohio
People from University Park, Texas